Charley "Doc" Williams (born February 4, 1928) is a former professional boxer from the 1940s and 50's. He fought many of the top fighters of his era, and held wins over several members of the famed Murderers' Row (boxing), including a win over Charley Burley and multiple wins over Bert Lytell. Williams also had a win over Bob Satterfield and notable bouts against all-time greats Archie Moore, Kid Gavilan and Jimmy Bivins. Like many African American boxers of his era, including Burley and Lytell, he never received a title shot despite being ranked as a top ten light heavyweight for many years. He retired in 1954 after a streak of three straight wins, with a record of 51 wins, 18 losses, and 2 draws.

References

1928 births

Boxers from New Jersey
People from Mahwah, New Jersey
Sportspeople from Bergen County, New Jersey
Living people
American male boxers